The Obiekt 775, or Object 775 (Объект 775), was a Soviet experimental missile tank built in 1964.

The tank had an extremely low profile, with a crew of two which sat in an isolated compartment in the turret. The main armament was a 125 mm rifled missile launcher, with a maximum range of 4 km for the "Rubin" anti-tank guided missiles, and 9 km for the "Bur" surface-to-surface missiles. It had a rate of fire of 4-5 rounds/min for the "Rubin", and 8-10 rounds/min for the "Bur". Both munitions were guided by an infra-red beam. The "Rubin" anti-tank missiles were capable of penetrating 250 mm of armor at 60° at a range of 4 km.

The Obiekt 775 used the same engine and transmission from T-64 tank. The Obiekt 775T (Объект 775Т) variant used two gas turbine engines instead of the diesel engine.

The prototype tank wasn't adopted for a number of reasons. The crew had poor visibility over the battlefield, the overall complexity of the design, and the low reliability of the missile guidance system.

See also
 IT-1
 Object 287
 SU-152 "Taran"

References

 http://armor.kiev.ua/Tanks/Modern/roket/roket1.php
 https://web.archive.org/web/20100603012254/http://www.museum-tank.ru/IIIwar/pages3/o7750.html

Tank destroyers
Chelyabinsk Tractor Plant products
Trial and research tanks of the Soviet Union
Abandoned military projects of the Soviet Union